Viewbank College is an Australian public secondary school located in the north eastern suburb of Viewbank, in Melbourne, Australia.

History and notable alumni
Viewbank College was founded on the site of Rosanna East High School in 1994, the result of a merger between it and Banyule High School.

The two original schools serviced the surrounding area, predominantly enrolling students situated in the City of Heidelberg (now known as the City of Banyule). Banyule High School commenced in 1961 and by 1970 its student population had swelled to over 900. As a result, Rosanna East High School was started in 1970 to reduce the pressure on Banyule High School. It began operating in the grounds of Rosanna Golf Links Primary School but the following year, with the completion of the construction of new buildings at the Warren Road site, the school moved to its permanent location in Viewbank. With decreasing enrolments in both schools, in 1993 talks were held in consideration of a merger. By January 1994, Viewbank College as a school had begun. On 6 November 1996, an official opening was conducted by the Honourable Richard McGarvie, the Governor of Victoria at the time.

The school continues to operate from the Warren Road site and retains ownership over the Banyule Theatre (previously part of Banyule High School) with the remaining land sold off for residential development. The school is predicted to have more than 2,000 students by 2022. The theatre is now used for teaching and performance.

Notable alumni include Ben Mendelsohn, international actor, Anthony Carbines, local member of Victorian State Parliament for the Ivanhoe electorate, Broden Kelly and Tom Armstrong from Melbourne sketch Comedy group Aunty Donna and Michael Hurley, Australian Rules footballer for Essendon Football Club

In 2019 sketch Comedy group Aunty Donna filmed a 16-part webseries entitled Glennridge Secondary College at Viewbank College, with funding and support from Screen Australia. It was released on YouTube weekly from 20 February 2019.

Program
As well as offering students diverse learning challenges in the classroom, students have opportunities to develop and explore their talents through the Enhanced Acceleration Program, the debating Program, the music and drama program and the extensive Sports Programs. Students are actively encouraged through the strong Student Leadership program to become involved in the greater life of the college.

The college encourages parent involvement through the College Council, Friends of Music, Friends of Viewbank and Friends of the Performing and Visual Arts.

Viewbank has an association with Narita Kokusai High School in Japan.

Performing Arts
In recent years Viewbank College has become renowned in the local area for their Musical Productions. Each year over 120 students are involved in all aspects of the shows, including but not limited to Cast, Stage Crew, Audio Crew, Lighting Crew, Orchestra, Makeup Crew and Front of House. The shows are generally "Big Broadway Musicals" attracting over 1400 ticket sales over 6 shows. Productions are held in July/August each year and were held at the college's Banyule Theatre until 2017.

In the 2015–16 State Budget, $11.5 million was allocated to the school to build a dedicated 400 seat Theatre and adjoining Performing Arts Facilities. Completion of the Arts Centre was in 2018. The project was managed by the Victorian School Building Authority. It now hosts the College Production each year as well as many more College events.

Incidents
In 2007 two students, one from Macleod College and the other from Greensborough Secondary College, burnt down a section of the junior school lockers and were caught after investigation by the police.

See also
 List of schools in Victoria
 Education in Victoria
 Education in Australia

Curriculum
 Victorian Essential Learning Standards (VELS)
 Victorian Certificate of Education (VCE)
 Victorian Certificate of Applied Learning (VCAL)

Authorities
 Victorian Curriculum and Assessment Authority (VCAA)
 Victorian Tertiary Admissions Centre (VTAC)
 Department of Education and Early Childhood Development
 Australian Curriculum, Assessment and Reporting Authority

References

External links
 Viewbank College, Rosanna, VIC at My School
 Viewbank College at The Good Schools Guide

Public high schools in Melbourne
Educational institutions established in 1994
1994 establishments in Australia
Buildings and structures in the City of Banyule